Profondeville is a municipality of Wallonia located in the province of Namur, Belgium. 

On January 1, 2016, Profondeville had a total population of 12,117.

The original municipality of Profondeville was expanded, during the post-1974 fusion of the Belgian municipalities, with the addition of the ancienne communes of Arbre, Bois-de-Villers, Lesve, Lustin, Rivière and the Lakisse area from the southeast of the newly-adjoining municipality of Floreffe.

Gallery

Twin towns
 Roquebrune-Cap-Martin, France

See also
 List of protected heritage sites in Profondeville

References

External links
 
Official website

Municipalities of Namur (province)